Yorktown Township is a township in Dickey County, in the U.S. state of North Dakota.

History
Yorktown Township was named after New York, the US state of origin of several early settlers.

References

Townships in Dickey County, North Dakota
Townships in North Dakota